Patricia Herrera Fernandez (born 9 February 1993) is a female water polo goalkeeper of Spain.

She was part of the Spanish team at the 2013 and 2015 World Aquatics Championships.

See also
 Spain women's Olympic water polo team records and statistics
 List of women's Olympic water polo tournament goalkeepers
 List of world champions in women's water polo
 List of World Aquatics Championships medalists in water polo

Notes

References

External links
 
 https://waterpolomadrid.com/tag/patricia-herrera/
 http://www.furiaroja.com/entrevistas/Patricia_Herrera.html
 https://periodistasumergida.wordpress.com/entrevistas/patri-herrera-una-guerrera-al-frente-de-la-porteria-espanola/
 http://www.radioset.es/partidoapartidoradio/secciones/camino-a-rio/waterpolo-conocemos-guerreras-Patricia-Herrera_27_2156580018.html

1993 births
Living people
Place of birth missing (living people)
Spanish female water polo players
Water polo goalkeepers
Olympic water polo players of Spain
Water polo players at the 2016 Summer Olympics
World Aquatics Championships medalists in water polo
21st-century Spanish women